Joshua Jones (born June 22, 1997) is an American football offensive tackle for the Arizona Cardinals of the National Football League (NFL). He played college football at Houston and was drafted by the Cardinals in the third round of the 2020 NFL Draft.

Early life and high school career
Jones grew up in Richmond, Texas and attended George Bush High School, where he played basketball and football. He was named second-team All-District 23-5A as a sophomore and to the first-team in his junior and senior seasons. Rated a three-star recruit, Jones originally committed to play college football at Oklahoma State going into his senior year. Jones de-committed from the school several days before National Signing Day and then announced his decision to attend Houston.

College career
Jones redshirted his true freshman season. Jones started all 13 of the Cougars's games as a redshirt freshman and ten the following season, missing two games due to a knee injury. He started all 13 of Houston's contests again as a redshirt junior. As a redshirt senior, Jones started nine games at left tackle and was named second-team All-American Athletic Conference. Following the end of the season, Jones was invited to play in the 2020 Senior Bowl.

Professional career

Jones was drafted by the Arizona Cardinals in the third round with the 72nd overall pick in the 2020 NFL Draft.

References

External links 
 Houston Cougars bio
 Arizona Cardinals bio

1997 births
Living people
People from Richmond, Texas
Players of American football from Texas
Sportspeople from the Houston metropolitan area
American football offensive tackles
Houston Cougars football players
Arizona Cardinals players